Walton-Verona High School is a public high school located at 16 School Road in Walton, Kentucky. The school's mascot is Bearcats, and it is in the Walton-Verona Independent Schools district.

School information
The Walton and Verona schools enjoys a rich history dating back to 1880. at that time there were two school districts one in Verona and another in Walton. The two districts consolidated into one school district in 1935. A grade school maintained in Verona and a High School in Walton became known as the Walton-Verona Independent Schools. Walton-Verona Middle School was constructed in 1954 as a high school with additions in 1962, 1973, 1989 and 1993. A new High School wing was constructed in 2007.

References

External links
 https://wv.kyschools.us

Public high schools in Kentucky
Educational institutions established in 1954
1954 establishments in Kentucky
Schools in Boone County, Kentucky